Teltevo is a rural locality (a village) in Mardengskoye Rural Settlement, Velikoustyugsky District, Vologda Oblast, Russia. The population was 12 as of 2002.

Geography 
Teltevo is located 18 km southwest of Veliky Ustyug (the district's administrative centre) by road. Moseyev Pochinok is the nearest rural locality.

References 

Rural localities in Velikoustyugsky District